The 14th FINA World Swimming Championships (25 m) were held from 11 to 16 December 2018 in Hangzhou, China. These championships featured swimming events in a 25-meter (short-course) pool.

Medal table

Results

Men's events

 Swimmers who participated in the heats only and received medals.

Women's events

 Swimmers who participated in the heats only and received medals.

Mixed events

 Swimmers who participated in the heats only and received medals.

External links
Results book

References

 
FINA World Swimming Championships (25 m)
FINA World Swimming Championships (25 m)
2018 in Chinese sport
International aquatics competitions hosted by China
Swimming competitions in China
Sport in Hangzhou
FINA World Swimming